Stenomelania juncea is a species of freshwater snail, an aquatic gastropod mollusk in the family Thiaridae.

The sister species of Stenomelania juncea is Stenomelania boninensis.

Distribution
The type locality is Taal Lake and small streams, Batangas, Luzon, Philippines.

Parasites
Stenomelania juncea is the first intermediate host for the trematode Haplorchis taichui.

References

External links

Thiaridae
Gastropods described in 1851